Sturnira known as a yellow-shouldered bat or American epauleted bat, is a genus of bat in the family Phyllostomidae. It contains the following species:
 Angel's yellow-shouldered bat, Sturnira angeli
 Aratathomas's yellow-shouldered bat, Sturnira aratathomasi
 Baker's yellow-shouldered bat, Sturnira bakeri
 Bidentate yellow-shouldered bat, Sturnira bidens
 Bogotá yellow-shouldered bat, Sturnira bogotensis
 Burton's yellow-shouldered bat, Sturnira burtonlimi
 Hairy yellow-shouldered bat, Sturnira erythromos
 Gianna's yellow-shouldered bat, Sturnira giannae
 Choco yellow-shouldered bat, Sturnira hondurensis
 Sturnira koopmanhilli
 Little yellow-shouldered bat, Sturnira lilium
 Highland yellow-shouldered bat, Sturnira ludovici
 Louis's yellow-shouldered bat, Sturnira luisi
 Greater yellow-shouldered bat, Sturnira magna
 Mistratoan yellow-shouldered bat, Sturnira mistratensis
 Talamancan yellow-shouldered bat, Sturnira mordax
 Lesser yellow-shouldered bat, Sturnira nana
 Tschudi's yellow-shouldered bat, Sturnira oporaphilum
 Northern yellow-shouldered bat, Sturnira parvidens
Paulson's yellow-shouldered bat, Sturnira paulsoni
 La Perla yellow-shouldered bat, Sturnira perla Soriano's yellow-shouldered bat, Sturnira sorianoi Thomas's yellow-shouldered bat, Sturnira thomasi Tilda's yellow-shouldered bat, Sturnira tildae''

References

Velazco, P.M. & B.D. Patterson. 2019. Small mammals of the Mayo River basin in northern Peru, with the description of a new species of Sturnira (Chiroptera: Phyllostomidae). Bulletin of the American Museum of Natural History 429:1-70.

 
Bat genera
Taxa named by John Edward Gray
Taxonomy articles created by Polbot